Zahid Mardanov (born 9 August 2000) is an Azerbaijani footballer who plays as a defender for Kapaz in the Azerbaijan Premier League.

Club career
On 11 May 2019, Mardanov made his debut in the Azerbaijan Premier League for Sabah match against Zira.

References

External links
 

2000 births
Living people
Association football defenders
Azerbaijani footballers
Azerbaijan youth international footballers
Azerbaijan Premier League players
Sabah FC (Azerbaijan) players
Kapaz PFK players